The 2019 Texas State Bobcats football team represented Texas State University in the 2019 NCAA Division I FBS football season. The Bobcats played their home games at the Bobcat Stadium in San Marcos, Texas and competed in the West Division of the Sun Belt Conference. They were led by first-year head coach Jake Spavital.

Preseason

Sun Belt media poll
The Sun Belt coaches poll was released on July 18, 2019. Texas State was picked to finish 5th in the West Division with 16 total votes.

Preseason All-Sun Belt teams
Texas State placed three players to the All-Sun Belt team.

Offense

2nd team

Aaron Brewer – SR, Offensive Lineman

Defensive

1st team

Bryan London II – SR, Linebacker

2nd team

Nikolas Daniels – SR, Linebacker

Award watch lists
Listed in the order that they were released

References:

Roster

Schedule
Texas State announced its 2019 football schedule on March 1, 2019. The 2019 schedule consists of 6 home and away games in the regular season.

Schedule Source:

Game summaries

at Texas A&M

Wyoming

at SMU

Georgia State

Nicholls

Louisiana–Monroe

at Arkansas State

at Louisiana

South Alabama

Troy

at Appalachian State

at Coastal Carolina

References

Texas State
Texas State Bobcats football seasons
Texas State Bobcats football